John Mitchel McLaughlin (born 29 October 1945) is the former General Secretary of Sinn Féin who also served as an MLA and was once the Speaker of the Northern Ireland Assembly. He was the first Nationalist speaker of the Assembly.

McLaughlin was born in the Bogside area of Derry, Northern Ireland and educated at Long Tower Boys School, Derry and Christian Brothers Technical College, Derry.

He was elected a member of the Northern Ireland Assembly for Foyle in the 1998 assembly election and re-elected in 2003. In March 2007, McLaughlin transferred to the South Antrim constituency where he topped the poll during the 2007 Assembly election. He was re-elected at the 2011 Assembly election.

After it was revealed that a consultancy contract on a new accounting system extended to 10 times the original budget, McLaughlin said, "I am very, very angry and I am very concerned that there appears to be almost a sense of immunity at the senior civil service level when these basic mistakes are made."

The party chairman came in for criticism in 2005 when he said the kidnapping and killing of Jean McConville – one of the Disappeared – was not a criminal act.

He is married and has three sons.

References

External links
 NIA profile

1945 births
Living people
Sinn Féin MLAs
Members of the Northern Ireland Forum
Northern Ireland MLAs 1998–2003
Northern Ireland MLAs 2003–2007
Northern Ireland MLAs 2007–2011
Northern Ireland MLAs 2011–2016
Politicians from Derry (city)
Speakers of the Northern Ireland Assembly
Sinn Féin parliamentary candidates